Hugh McDonald McLaren (13 January 1901 – 8 March 1971) was a Scottish professional footballer who played as a centre half.

Career
Born in Kilwinning, McLaren played for Dalry Thistle, Nithsdale Wanderers, Aberdeen, Kilmarnock, Workington, Bradford City, Tranmere Rovers, Rochdale and Ashley Bridge.

During a short loan at Kilmarnock from Aberdeen he played only two games: the semi-final and final of the 1928–29 Scottish Cup, returning north with a winner's medal after helping the Killie defence keep clean sheets against the forwards of Celtic at Ibrox followed by Rangers at Hampden. He joined Bradford City in June 1933 from Workington. He made 24 league appearances for the club, scoring once, and also made 1 appearance in the FA Cup. He left the club in July 1935, signing for Tranmere Rovers.

Sources

References

1901 births
1971 deaths
Scottish footballers
Footballers from North Ayrshire
Dalry Thistle F.C. players
Nithsdale Wanderers F.C. players
Aberdeen F.C. players
Kilmarnock F.C. players
Workington A.F.C. players
Bradford City A.F.C. players
Tranmere Rovers F.C. players
Rochdale A.F.C. players
Scottish Junior Football Association players
Scottish Football League players
English Football League players
Association football defenders
People from Kilwinning